Dubsound & Power is a 2000 album by Christafari. It contains instrumental mixes of songs from his WordSound&Power album.

Track listing
All tracks by Mark Mohr except where noted.

 "Dub Inna de Night" – 5:45
 "Dub of My Life" (Derrick Jefferson, Mohr) – 5:43
 "Babylon Has Fallen" (Mohr, Wayne Swiderski) – 2:54
 "Dubbing on the Frontline" (Jefferson, Kevin Kelleher, Mohr, Scott Whelan) – 7:13
 "Lift Him Up and Dub It Up Daily" (Case, Max Fulwider, Jefferson, Mohr, Whelan) – 5:22
 "Render Your Dub" (Case, Jim Kleinman, Mohr) – 4:06
 "Why You Ago Look?" [A Cappella] (Jefferson, Kevin Kelleher, Mohr, Whelan) – 1:51
 "Selassie Say II" (Interlude) – 0:42
 "Why You Ago Dub?" – 3:41
 "Emancipation Dub-the-Nation" – 5:17
 "My Other Radio" (Interlude) – 0:50
 "The Dub's So Nice – 5:04
 "Dub and Fire" (Jefferson, Mohr) – 5:22
 "Thief Inna de Night" [A Cappella] (Interlude)  – 0:20
 "Everyday Dubbing" – 4:34
 "How You Fe Dub Me?" – 5:02
 "As the Dub Goes By" – 4:18
 "Dub Sound and Power" – 5:12

Personnel
Lead Vocals – Mark Mohr
Additional Vocals – Ace Winn, Bernard Schroter, Geneman & Othniel Lewis
Background Vocals – Mark Mohr, Vanessa Mohr, Bernard Schroter, Diedrich Jones, Lyndon Allen, Scott Wehlen, Viki Hampton, Ace Winn
Drums – Kevin Kelleher
Bass – Anthony Case, Jim Kleinman
Guitar – Anthony Case, Chris Howell, Jim Kleinman,Rick Strickland
Piano & Synth & Organ – Scott Wehlen, Othniel Lewis
Saxophone – Max Elliott Fulwider
Trombone – Barry Greene & Chris McDonald
Trumpet – Jeff Bailey & Denver Bierman
Percussion – Mark Mohr, Kevin Kelleher
Niyabinghi Drums –  Mark Mohr, Kevin Kelleher, Scott Wehlen, Diedrich Jones
Acoustic Guitar – Mike Severs, Jim Kleinman
Crowd & Shouting Vocals – Mark Mohr, Kevin Kelleher, Scott Wehlen, Diedrich Jones, Troy Buchanan III, Othniel Lewis

References

Christafari albums
Dub albums
2000 remix albums